The China women's national volleyball team represents the People's Republic of China in international volleyball competitions and friendly matches governed by Chinese Volleyball Association. They are one of the leading and most successful squads in women's international volleyball, having won ten championships titles in the three major international competitions of volleyball, including five World Cups (1981, 1985, 2003, 2015, 2019), two World Championships (1982, 1986) and three Olympic titles (1984, 2004, 2016). The current head coach is Cai Bin.

China took five consecutive World titles in the 1980s. The most recent three competition records are the third place in the 2018 World Women's Volleyball Championship, the 2019 Women's Volleyball World Cup champion, and the 2020 Tokyo Olympics missed the top 8.  In 2011, 2014, 2015 and 2016, the Chinese women's volleyball team won the "Best team" award in the CCTV sportsmanship competition. The team now ranks the 5th place of the FIVB World Rankings (Women's).

Team Honours 
Updated after 2022 Asian Cup

Tournaments Results

Olympic Games
  1984 —  Gold Medal
Lang Ping, Liang Yan, Zhu Ling, Hou Yuzhu, Zhou Xiaolan, Yang Xilan, Su Huijuan, Jiang Ying, Li Yanjun, Yang Xiaojun, Zheng Meizhu and Zhang Rongfang (c). Head coach: Yuan Weimin.
  1988 —  Bronze Medal
Li Guojun, Zhao Hong, Hou Yuzhu, Wang Yajun, Yang Xilan (c), Su Huijuan, Jiang Ying, Cui Yongmei, Yang Xiaojun, Zheng Meizhu, Wu Dan and Li Yueming. Head coach: Li Yaoxian.
  1992 — 7th place
Lai Yawen, Li Guojun (c), Zhou Hong, Ma Fang, Wang Yi, Su Huijuan, Chen Fengqin, Su Liqun, Sun Yue, Wu Dan, Gao Lin and Li Yueming. Head coach: Hu Jin.
  1996 —  Silver Medal
Lai Yawen (c), Li Yan, Cui Yongmei, Zhu Yunying, Wu Yongmei, Wang Yi, He Qi, Pan Wenli, Liu Xiaoning, Wang Ziling, Sun Yue and Wang Lina. Head coach: Lang Ping.
  2000 — 5th place
Wu Dan, Li Yan, Zhu Yunying, Wu Yongmei, Li Shan, He Qi, Chen Jing, Sun Yue (c), Qiu Aihua, Gui Chaoran, Wang Lina and Yin Yin. Head coach: Hu Jin.
  2004 —  Gold Medal
Feng Kun (c), Yang Hao, Liu Yanan, Li Shan, Zhou Suhong, Zhao Ruirui, Zhang Yuehong, Chen Jing, Song Nina, Wang Lina, Zhang Na and Zhang Ping. Head coach: Chen Zhonghe.
  2008 —  Bronze Medal
Wang Yimei, Feng Kun (c), Yang Hao, Liu Yanan, Wei Qiuyue, Xu Yunli, Zhou Suhong, Zhao Ruirui, Xue Ming, Li Juan, Zhang Na and Ma Yunwen. Head coach: Chen Zhonghe.
  2012 — 5th place
 Wang Yimei, Mi Yang, Hui Ruoqi, Chu Jinling, Zhang Xian, Wei Qiuyue (c), Yang Junjing, Shan Danna, Xu Yunli, Zeng Chunlei, Ma Yunwen and Zhang Lei. Head coach: Yu Juemin.
  2016 —  Gold Medal 
 Yuan Xinyue, Zhu Ting, Yang Fangxu, Gong Xiangyu, Wei Qiuyue, Zhang Changning, Liu Xiaotong, Xu Yunli, Hui Ruoqi (c), Lin Li, Ding Xia and Yan Ni. Head coach: Lang Ping.
  2020 — 9th place
 Yuan Xinyue, Zhu Ting (c), Gong Xiangyu, Wang Yuanyuan, Zhang Changning, Liu Xiaotong, Yao Di, Li Yingying, Ding Xia, Yan Ni, Wang Mengjie and Liu Yanhan. Head coach: Lang Ping.

World Championship
 1956 — 6th place
 1962 — 9th place
 1974 — 14th place
 1978 — 6th place
 1982 —  Gold Medal
Lang Ping, Liang Yan, Cao Huiying, Yang Xi, Zhou Xiaolan, Yang Xilan, Chen Yaqiong, Jiang Ying, Sun Jinfang (c), Chen Zhaodi, Zheng Meizhu, Zhang Rongfang. Head Coach: Yuan Weimin.
 1986 —  Gold Medal
Hu Xiaofeng, Liang Yan, Liu Wei, Hou Yuzhu, Yin Qin, Yang Xilan (c), Su Huijuan, Jiang Ying, Li Yanjun, Yang Xiaojun, Zheng Meizhu, Wu Dan. Head coach: Zhang Rongfang.
 1990 —  Silver Medal
Lang Ping, Qi Lili, He Yunshu, Lai Yawen, Li Guojun, Su Liqun, Li Yueming, Xu Xin, Wu Dan, Mao Wuyang, Su Huijuan (c), Zhou Hong. Head Coach: Hu Jin.
 1994 — 8th place
Lai Yawen (c), Cui Yongmei, Mao Julan, Wang Yi, Pan Wenli, Su Liqun, Wang Ziling, Sun Yue, Su Huijuan, Ji Liping, Qi Lili, Yin Yin. Head Coach: Li Xiaofeng.
 1998 —  Silver Medal
Lai Yawen (c), Li Yan, Cui Yongmei, Zhu Yunying, Wu Yongmei, He Qi, Yin Yin, Li Yizhi, Wang Ziling, Sun Yue, Qiu Aihua, Wang Lina. Head Coach: Lang Ping.
 2002 — 4th place
 Zhang Jing, Feng Kun (c), Yang Hao, Liu Yanan, Li Shan, Zhou Suhong, Zhao Ruirui, Zhang Yuehong, Chen Jing, Song Nina, Li Ying, Xiong Zi. Head coach: Chen Zhonghe.
 2006 — 5th place
 Wang Yimei, Feng Kun (c), Yang Hao, Liu Yanan, Chu Jinling, Li Shan, Zhou Suhong, Li Juan, Song Nina, Zhang Na, Xu Yunli, Zhang Ping. Head coach: Chen Zhonghe.
 2010 — 10th place
 Wang Yimei, Zhang Lei, Yang Jie, Shen Jingsi, Zhou Suhong, Zhang Xian, Wei Qiuyue (c), Li Juan, Xu Yunli, Xue Ming, Chen Liyi, Ma Yunwen. Head coach: Yu Juemin.
 2014 —  Silver Medal 
Yuan Xinyue, Zhu Ting, Yang Fangxu, Shen Jingsi, Yang Junjing, Wei Qiuyue, Zeng Chunlei, Liu Xiaotong, Shan Danna, Xu Yunli, Hui Ruoqi (c), Chen Zhan, Wang Huimin, Wang Na. Head coach: Lang Ping.
 2018 —  Bronze Medal
Yuan Xinyue, Zhu Ting (c), Yang Hanyu, Hu Mingyuan, Gong Xiangyu, Zeng Chunlei, Zhang Changning, Liu Xiaotong, Yao Di, Li Yingying, Lin Li, Ding Xia, Yan Ni, Wang Mengjie. Head coach: Lang Ping.
  2022 — 6th place 
Yuan Xinyue (c), Diao Linyu, Yang Hanyu, Gao Yi, Gong Xiangyu, Wang Yuanyuan, Jin Ye, Wang Yunlu, Wang Yizhu, Li Yingying, Wang Weiyi, Ding Xia, Wang Mengjie, Chen Peiyan. Head coach: Cai Bin.

World Cup
 1977 — 4th place
 Xu Xiumei, Cao Huiying (c), Yang Xi, Wang Aixiang, Qi Lixia, Lin Hui, Zhou Xiaolan, Sun Jinfang, Chen Zhaodi, Zhang Jieyun, Zhang Rongfang and Shen Sanying. Head coach: Yuan Weimin.
 1981 —  Gold Medal
 Cao Huiying, Liang Yan, Lang Ping, Zhou Xiaolan, Yang Xi, Sun Jinfang (c), Chen Zhaodi, Zhou Lumin, Zhu Ling, Chen Yaqiong, Zhang Rongfang and Zhang Jieyun. Head coach: Yuan Weimin.
 1985 —  Gold Medal
Lang Ping (c), Liang Yan, Lin Guoqing, Hou Yuzhu, Yin Qin, Yang Xilan, Su Huijuan, Jiang Ying, Li Yanjun, Yang Xiaojun, Zheng Meizhu and Wu Dan. Head coach: Deng Ruozeng. 
 1989 —  Bronze Medal
 Lai Yawen, Li Guojun, Li Guizhi, Zhou Hong, Mao Wuyang, He Yunshu, Su Huijuan (c), Li Yunwu, Xu Xin, Sun Lijuan, Wu Dan and Li Yueming. Head coach: Hu Jin.
 1991 —  Silver Medal
 Lai Yawen, Li Guojun, Zhou Hong, Ma Fang, Wang Yi, Su Huijuan, Chen Fengqin, Xu Xin (c), Qi Lili, Wu Dan, Gao Lin and Li Yueming. Head coach: Hu Jin.
 1995 —  Bronze Medal
 Lai Yawen (c), Li Yan, Cui Yongmei, Zhu Yunying, Wu Yongmei, Wang Yi, He Qi, Pan Wenli, Wang Ziling, Sun Yue, Deng Yang and Yin Yin. Head coach: Lang Ping.
 1999 — 5th place
 Gui Chaoran, Zhu Yunying, Wu Yongmei, Li Shan, He Qi, Chen Jing, Sun Yue (c), Qiu Aihua, Zhou Suhong, Wang Lina, Lin Wenzhen and Yin Yin. Head coach: Hu Jin.
 2003 —  Gold Medal
Feng Kun (c), Yang Hao, Liu Yanan, Li Shan, Zhou Suhong, Zhao Ruirui, Zhang Yuehong, Chen Jing, Song Nina, Wang Lina, Zhang Na and Zhang Ping. Head coach: Chen Zhonghe.
 2007 — Did not participate (2008 Beijing Summer Olympics host country cannot participate)
 2011 —  Bronze Medal
 Wang Yimei, Mi Yang, Yang Jie, Hui Ruoqi, Zhang Xian, Wei Qiuyue (c), Yang Junjing, Shan Danna, Xu Yunli, Yang Zhou, Chen Liyi, Ma Yunwen, Zhang Lei and Fan Linlin. Head coach: Yu Juemin.
 2015 —  Gold Medal
 Yuan Xinyue, Zhu Ting, Shen Jingsi, Yang Junjing, Wei Qiuyue, Zeng Chunlei (c), Zhang Changning, Zhang Xiaoya, Lin Li, Ding Xia, Yan Ni, Wang Mengjie, Liu Yanhan and Liu Xiaotong. Head coach: Lang Ping.
 2019 —  Gold Medal
 Yuan Xinyue, Zhu Ting (c), Yang Hanyu, Gong Xiangyu, Wang Yuanyuan, Zeng Chunlei, Zhang Changning, Liu Xiaotong, Yao Di, Li Yingying, Zheng Yixin, Lin Li, Ding Xia, Yan Ni, Wang Mengjie and Liu Yanhan. Head coach: Lang Ping.

World Grand Champions Cup
 1993 —  Silver Medal
 Lai Yawen (c), Xiao Jianhua, Cui Yongmei, Mao Julan, Ma Fang, Wang Yi, Yang Zhe, Pan Wenli, Su Liqun, Sun Yue, Chen Xuya, Ji Liping. Head coach: Li Xiaofeng.
 1997 — 4th place
 Lai Yawen (c), Li Yan, Zhu Yunying, Wu Yongmei, He Qi, Wang Ziling, Sun Yue, Qiu Aihua, Wang Lina, Zhang Jinwen, Shen Hong, Li Yizhi. Head coach: Lang Ping.
 2001 —  Gold Medal
 Zhang Jing, Feng Kun (c), Yang Hao, Liu Yanan, Li Shan, Zhou Suhong, Zhao Ruirui, Zhang Yuehong, Chen Jing, Song Nina, Xiong Zi, Lin Hanying. Head Coach: Chen Zhonghe.
 2005 —  Bronze Medal
 Wang Yimei, Feng Kun (c), Yang Hao, Liu Yanan, Chu Jinling, Zhou Suhong, Xue Ming, Li Juan, Song Nina, Ma Yunwen, Zhang Na, Zhang Ping. Head Coach: Chen Zhonghe.
 2017 —  Gold Medal
 Yuan Xinyue, Zhu Ting (c), Gong Xiangyu, Diao Linyu, Yao Di, Zhang Changning, Liu Xiaotong, Zheng Yixin, Wang Chenyue, Lin Li, Ding Xia, Wang Mengjie, Yan Ni, Zeng Chunlei. Head Coach: An Jiajie.

World Grand Prix

 1993 —  Silver Medal
 1994 —  Bronze Medal
 1995 — 4th place
 1996 — 4th place
 1997 — 5th place
 1998 — 4th place
 1999 —  Bronze Medal
 2000 — 4th place
 2001 —  Silver Medal
 2002 —  Silver Medal
 2003 —  Gold Medal
 2004 — 5th place
 2005 —  Bronze Medal
 2006 — 5th place
 2007 —  Silver Medal
 2008 — 5th place
 2009 — 5th place
 2010 — 4th place
 2011 — 8th place
 2012 — 5th place
 2013 —  Silver Medal
 2014 — 5th place
 2015 — 4th place
 2016 — 5th place
 2017 — 4th place

Volleyball Nations League

 2018 —  Bronze Medal
 2019 —  Bronze Medal
 2020 — Cancelled due to COVID-19 pandemic
 2021 — 5th place
 2022 — 6th place

Asian Games

 1974 —  Bronze Medal
 1978 —  Silver Medal
 1982 —  Gold Medal
 1986 —  Gold Medal
 1990 —  Gold Medal
 1994 —  Silver Medal
 1998 —  Gold Medal
 2002 —  Gold Medal
 2006 —  Gold Medal
 2010 —  Gold Medal
 2014 —  Silver Medal
 2018 —  Gold Medal
 2022 — To be determined

Asian Championship

 1975 —  Bronze Medal
 1979 —  Gold Medal
 1983 —  Silver Medal
 1987 —  Gold Medal
 1989 —  Gold Medal
 1991 —  Gold Medal
 1993 —  Gold Medal
 1995 —  Gold Medal
 1997 —  Gold Medal
 1999 —  Gold Medal
 2001 —  Gold Medal
 2003 —  Gold Medal
 2005 —  Gold Medal
 2007 —  Silver Medal
 2009 —  Silver Medal
 2011 —  Gold Medal
 2013 —  4th place
 2015 —  Gold Medal
 2017 — 4th place
 2019 — 4th place

Asian Cup

 2008 —  Gold Medal
 2010 —  Gold Medal
 2012 —  Silver Medal
 2014 —  Gold Medal
 2016 —  Gold Medal
 2018 —  Gold Medal
 2022 —  Silver Medal

2022 Results and fixtures

Intercontinental tournaments

FIVB Women's Nations League
Dates: 31 May – 17 July
FIVB rankings points: 40 points

FIVB Women's World Championship
Dates: 23 September – 15 October
Host Countries:  Netherlands,  Poland
FIVB rankings points: 45 points

Continental tournaments

Asian Women's Volleyball Cup
Dates: 21–29 August
Host country:  Manila, Philippines

Team

Current roster
The following is the Chinese roster for the 2022 FIVB Volleyball Women's World Championship.

Head coach: Cai Bin

Former roster
The following is the Chinese roster for the 2020 Summer Olympics.

Head coach: Lang Ping

Head coaches
Note: The following list may not be complete.

  Li Ange (1954–1956)
  Hou Weiyi (1956, 1959–1962)
  Qian Jiaxiang (1957)
  He Bingkun (1958, 1965)
  Que Yongwu (1963–1964)
  Ma Zhanyuan (1966)
  Wang Suyun (1972)
  Xu Jie (1972)
  Li Zongyong (1972–1974)
  Han Yunbo (1975)
  Yuan Weimin (1976–1984)
  Deng Ruozeng (1985)
  Zhang Rongfang (1986)
  Li Yaoxian (1987–1988)
  Hu Jin (1989–1992,1999–2000)
  Li Xiaofeng (1993–1994)
  Lang Ping (1995–1998, 2013–2021)
  Chen Zhonghe (2001–2008)
  Cai Bin (2009, 2022-present)
  Wang Baoquan (2010)
  Yu Juemin (2010–2012)
  An Jiajie (interim) (2017–2018)

Notable squads

Sponsorships 
The team has sponsorship agreements with many companies such as bedding brand DeRucci-MuSi and edible oils brand COFCO Fulinmen.

The team now is sponsored by or cooperated with China Pacific Insurance Company (CPIC), Adidas, Tencent QQ Sports.

See also
China women's national under-23 volleyball team
China women's national under-20 volleyball team
China women's national under-18 volleyball team
Leap (film), 2020 film about the team

References

External links
Official website
FIVB profile

China national volleyball team
Volleyball
National women's volleyball teams